Enteromius brevidorsalis (dwarf barb) is a species of ray-finned fish in the genus Enteromius which occurs in southern central Africa in the upper Zambezi basin and nearby rivers.

Footnotes 

 

Enteromius
Taxa named by George Albert Boulenger
Fish described in 1915
Cyprinid fish of Africa